Nuvi is a software and marketing services company that develops a SaaS customer experience management (CXM) and social media marketing platform. The Nuvi platform has eight tools: Listen, Plan, Publish, Engage, Analyze, Locate, Review, and Capture. The tools aggregate data from across public and private sources of social media, print media, blog, forum, video, and online review content, apply artificial intelligence algorithms to highlight key marketing insights, and enable teams to plan and publish original marketing content.

Nuvi's SaaS-based Social Media Suite is used by 300 international customers and 800+ U.S. customers, including 85 customers in its home state of Utah.

History 
In August 2013, Nuvi launched a new tool to help analyze user groups on Twitter for trends.

In August 2015, Nuvi launched "Audiences" as a tool to give marketers access to Facebook's total aggregated and anonymized topic data.

In January, 2017, Nuvi was named Business of the Year for Utah County, Utah.

In September 2017, Nuvi cut the ribbon for the Nuvi Basketball Center named for them at the Utah Valley University (UVU).

In July 2020, Nuvi was included in the MarTech RADAR 2019 list of top B2B technology companies.

In August 2020, Nuvi was identified as one of the world's fastest growing SaaS companies by SaaS Magazine.

In August 2020, Nuvi released a study showing that companies that implemented Customer Experience solutions saw a 78% increase in revenue over a three-year period.

In May 2016, Nuvi expanded into a 45,000 square foot building in Utah’s Thanksgiving Point Business Park. An array of six 48” high-definition screens are located centrally in the Command Center to produce visual displays of social media feeds in real time. In addition to the Command Center, the office also features snack stations, a bleacher-style stadium conference room, open-area work spaces, and an indoor gym.

In July, 2018, Nuvi was acquired by Chicago-based social-media software firm and agency, Brickfish.

In May, 2019, Brickfish rebranded its entire suite of social media software solutions as Nuvi. The apps that are part of the Nuvi Suite are Nuvi Listen (social media listening), Nuvi Plan (content strategy and planning), Nuvi Publish (team collaboration and publishing), Nuvi Engage (reputation management), and Nuvi Analyze (campaign analytics).

In May 2019, Nuvi acquired Utah-based social-healthcare software company, Banyan.

In April 2021, Nuvi was acquired by the online reputation management firm, Reputation.com.

References

Social media companies
2012 establishments in Ohio